Ramnefjellsfossen (also known as: Utigardsfossen or Utigordsfossen) is unofficially listed as the third-highest waterfall in the world in several publications. On the other hand, The World Waterfall Database, a waterfall enthusiast website, which includes all minor and seasonal waterfalls in the country, lists it as eleventh-tallest.

The falls are fed by the Ramnefjellbreen glacier, an arm of the great Jostedalsbreen glacier. After the falls, the water flows into the lake Lovatnet. The falls are easily reached by boat, sea plane, or road, and a campsite is located within hiking distance of the base of the falls. Due to the small flow of water it is one of the few major waterfalls in Norway that has not been slated for hydroelectric usage.

The mountain, Ramnefjellet, has killed over 100 people as a result of major landslides in 1905 and 1936.  A 2008 photograph of the falls taken from Lovatnet lake was included in the Emirates "Skywards" brochure.

See also
List of waterfalls by height

References

External links

 The Lodal incident 

Stryn
Tiered waterfalls
Waterfalls of Vestland